Urve Tiidus ( Uussaar; born 6 June 1954) is an Estonian politician, member of the Reform Party and former journalist. She was Minister of Culture in Taavi Rõivas's first cabinet. She has been a member of Riigikogu since 2011. Before that she served as the mayor of Kuressaare.

Early life
Urve Tiidus was born on 6 June 1954 in Rapla. She studied at Tallinn School No. 21 and graduated from the University of Tartu as an English philologist in 1977. After graduation, she started  her career in television. She has also been a news anchor of Aktuaalne kaamera, a popular Estonian evening news programme on ETV. She was a spokeswoman for the Estonian voting results at the Eurovision Song Contests of 1994 and 1998.

From 2005-2011, Urve Tiidus was the Mayor of Kuressaare. From 1999-2001, Urve Tiidus served as the Director of the Kuressaare City Government's Department of Education and Culture. Urve Tiidus has worked for a long time in the field of journalism, working for Eesti Televisioon from 1977-1991 and from 1995-1999. During the period 2001-2005, she was a news anchor in the Kanal 2 news division.

Political career
President Toomas Hendrik Ilves named Urve Tiidus as the new Minister of Culture on the proposal of Prime Minister Andrus Ansip. According to law, the Minister can begin performing her duties after taking the oath of office before the Riigikogu.
Prior to assuming her position as Minister of Culture, Urve Tiidus served as a member of the Riigikogu’s European Union Affairs Committee and the Finance Committee.

Minister of Culture
On 4 December 2013 Urve Tiidus became Minister of Culture in Andrus Ansip's government after Rein Lang's resignation.

References

1954 births
Living people
People from Rapla
Estonian Reform Party politicians
Ministers of Culture of Estonia
Members of the Riigikogu, 2011–2015
Members of the Riigikogu, 2015–2019
Members of the Riigikogu, 2019–2023
Mayors of Kuressaare
Estonian journalists
Estonian women journalists
Estonian television personalities
21st-century Estonian politicians
21st-century Estonian women politicians
Women members of the Riigikogu
Women government ministers of Estonia
Women mayors of places in Estonia
University of Tartu alumni
Members of the Riigikogu, 2007–2011